The men's 400 metres at the 1978 European Athletics Championships was held in Prague, then Czechoslovakia, at Stadion Evžena Rošického on 30 and 31 August, and 1 September 1978.

Medalists

Results
1 September

Semi-finals
31 August

Semi-final 1

Semi-final 2

Heats
30 August

Heat 1

Heat 2

Heat 3

Heat 4

Participation
According to an unofficial count, 25 athletes from 14 countries participated in the event.

 (3)
 (2)
 (1)
 (1)
 (2)
 (3)
 (1)
 (1)
 (1)
 (2)
 (1)
 (3)
 (3)
 (1)

References

400 metres
400 metres at the European Athletics Championships